The 2019–20 South Dakota State Jackrabbits men's basketball team represented South Dakota State University during the 2019–20 NCAA Division I men's basketball season. The Jackrabbits, led by first-year head coach Eric Henderson, played their home games at Frost Arena in Brookings, South Dakota as members of the Summit League. They finished the season 22–10, 13–3 in Summit League play to finish in a tie for the Summit League regular season championship. They lost in the quarterfinals of the Summit League tournament to Purdue Fort Wayne.

Previous season 
The Jackrabbits finished the season 24–9, 14–2 in Summit League play to win the Summit League regular season championship. In the Summit League tournament, they lost to Western Illinois in the first round of the tournament. The Jackrabbits received an automatic bid to the NIT where they lost in the first round to Texas.

Roster

Schedule and results

|-
!colspan=9 style=|Exhibition

|-
!colspan=9 style=|Non-conference regular season 

|-
!colspan=9 style=| Summit League regular season

|-
!colspan=9 style=| Summit League tournament

Source

References

South Dakota State Jackrabbits men's basketball seasons
South Dakota State
South Dakota State Jackrabbits men's basketball
South Dakota State Jackrabbits men's basketball